Jonatan Vseviov (born 14 August 1981) is an Estonian diplomat.

He is graduated from the University of Tartu in political science.

From 2018-2021, he was Ambassador of Estonia to the United States.

On January 29, 2021, President Kersti Kaljulaid invited Vseviov to serve as the chancellor of the Ministry of Foreign Affairs.

Awards 
 2018: Order of the White Star, III class.

Personal life
He is married and he has two children. His father is historian David Vseviov. Vseviov is of Jewish heritage.

References

1981 births
Living people
Ambassadors of Estonia to the United States
Recipients of the Order of the White Star, 3rd Class
Estonian people of Jewish descent
University of Tartu alumni